Scada zibia, the Zibia clearwing, is a species of butterfly of the family Nymphalidae. It is found in Central and South America.

Subspecies
Scada zibia zibia; (Colombia)
Scada zibia batesi Haensch, 1903 (Ecuador, Peru)
Scada zibia perpuncta Kaye, 1918 (Colombia, Peru)
Scada zibia quotidiana Haensch, 1909 (Ecuador, Peru)
Scada zibia xanthina (Bates, 1866) (Nicaragua to Panama)
Scada zibia zeroca Fox, 1967 (Ecuador)

References

Butterflies described in 1856
Ithomiini
Nymphalidae of South America
Taxa named by William Chapman Hewitson